Forks Mountain may refer to the following mountains:

 Forks Mountain (Essex County, New York)
 Forks Mountain (Lake Pleasant, New York), in Hamilton County, New York
 Forks Mountain (Wells, New York), in Hamilton County, New York